Aponia is a genus of moths of the family Crambidae.

Species
Aponia aponianalis (Druce, 1899)
Aponia insularis Munroe, 1964
Aponia itzalis Munroe, 1964
Aponia major Munroe, 1964
Aponia minnithalis (Druce, 1895)

References

Pyraustinae
Crambidae genera
Taxa named by Eugene G. Munroe